Sébastien Vahaamahina (born 21 October 1991) is a French rugby union player of Wallisian origin from the French-administered South Pacific overseas collectivity of New Caledonia. 

Vahaamahina's position is Lock and in 2014 played for Clermont Auvergne in the Top 14. He began his career in New Caledonia and after moving to France, played with Brive before moving to Perpignan from 2011 to 2014. He was called up for France for the 2012 autumn internationals.

Born to parents from the Wallis and Futuna Polynesian community in Noumea, Vahaamahina began his rugby career in New Caledonia, in the South Pacific before moving to mainland France.

International career
Vahaamahina represented France in the 2019 Rugby World Cup and scored their first try in the quarter-final against Wales, but was sent off after elbowing Welsh player Aaron Wainwright in the head. Wales went on to win the match by a scoreline of 20-19. The day after the match he announced he would retire from international rugby.

International tries

References

1991 births
Living people
French rugby union players
People from Nouméa
French people of New Caledonian descent
French people of Wallis and Futuna descent
Rugby union players from Wallis and Futuna
USA Perpignan players
ASM Clermont Auvergne players
Rugby union locks
France international rugby union players